Calvin Fillmore (April 30, 1775 – October 22, 1865) was an American farmer and politician from New York.  He served as coroner of Erie County, New York and a member of the New York State Assembly, and is best known as the uncle of President Millard Fillmore.

Life
Fillmore was born in Bennington County, Vermont on December 12, 1775.  His father, Nathaniel Fillmore Sr., was a farmer and officer in the Green Mountain Boys who was a veteran of the American Revolution.

Calvin Fillmore was educated in Bennington, and became a farmer.  In 1798, he married Jerusha Turner (d. 1852).  Fillmore was close with his brother Nathaniel Fillmore, and in 1798, they moved to an area then located in Onondaga County, New York, which is now in Summerhill, Cayuga County.

During the War of 1812, Fillmore was appointed a captain in the 13th Infantry Regiment of the New York Militia, and took part in several battles in upstate New York and Canada.  He was promoted to major, and then lieutenant colonel, and commanded the regiment before the end of the war.  He later served as lieutenant colonel of the militia's 17th Regiment.

In 1819, Nathaniel and Calvin Fillmore and their families moved to Montville, then in the Town of Sempronius, now in Moravia. Later they moved to East Aurora, in Erie County.  In addition to farming, he kept a tavern and hotel, and owned a sawmill and other businesses.  He also became involved in the development of the local transportation infrastructure as an original incorporator of the Aurora and Buffalo Railroad.

Fillmore was coroner of Erie County, and a deputy U.S. marshal. He was a member of the New York State Assembly (Erie Co.) in 1825, elected as a Democratic-Republican.

He died in East Aurora on October 22, 1865, and was buried at East Aurora Cemetery.

U.S. President Millard Fillmore was his nephew.

References

Sources

Further reading
Millard Fillmore by Robert J. Scarry (2001;  ; pg. 14f and 22)
The New York Civil List compiled by Franklin Benjamin Hough (pages 202 and 273; Weed, Parsons and Co., 1858)

1775 births
1865 deaths
People from Bennington, Vermont
People from Cayuga County, New York
People from East Aurora, New York
New York (state) Democratic-Republicans
Members of the New York State Assembly
Burials in New York (state)
Calvin